Mohill Community College is a secondary school in Mohill, Ireland.  It is a community school, formed from the merger of two existing local schools.

History
Before the school opened in September 2008, there were two secondary schools in the town, Mohill Vocational School (sometimes known as the tec) and Marian College (sometimes known as the convent). The two schools amalgamated in 2008 to form Mohill Community College. Since its opening the school has been a mixed school.

Sports
The school has an astro turf pitch, a basketball court, a tennis court, and a GAA pitch. It has a GAA team, a soccer team, and a basketball team. There is also a sports hall with a gym at the right end.

Notes

References

Secondary schools in County Leitrim
2008 establishments in Ireland
Educational institutions established in 2008
Mohill